Ashley Smith (born 13 February 1987 in Caerleon, Newport, Wales) is a retired Welsh rugby union player who played as a centre for Newport Gwent Dragons. Smith attended Caerleon Comprehensive School and represented Wales at Under 16, 18 and 19 level and captained the Wales under 20 team for the 2007 six nations tournament.

Smith made his debut for Newport Gwent Dragons in the 2005–06 season and was appointed captain due to injury to Luke Charteris in September 2009.

In May 2010 he was voted Newport Gwent Dragons Player of the Year in a poll of South Wales Argus readers.

Ashley Smith was forced to retire at the end of the 2014–15 season because of recurring concussions.

References

External links
Newport Gwent Dragons profile

1987 births
Living people
Dragons RFC players
Newport HSOB RFC players
People educated at Caerleon Comprehensive School
Rugby union players from Caerleon
Welsh rugby union players
Rugby union centres